Stroup Peak is a peak rising to  at the extremity of the ridge extending east from Mount Curtiss in the Gonville and Caius Range of Victoria Land. It was named by the Advisory Committee on Antarctic Names in 2007 after CW04 William E. Stroup, Civil Engineer Corps, U.S. Navy (Seabees), who at the time was the senior enlisted Construction Electrician Chief and member of the construction crew which built the original Little America V Station and the original Byrd Station in the 1955-57 pre-IGY period. He was also a member of the Byrd Traverse to Byrd Station in 1956.

References

Mountains of Victoria Land